Chester Bowman (November 22, 1901 – May 31, 1936) was an American sprinter who competed in the 1924 Summer Olympics.

References

1901 births
1936 deaths
Olympic track and field athletes of the United States
Athletes (track and field) at the 1924 Summer Olympics
American male sprinters
Track and field athletes from New Jersey
People from West Long Branch, New Jersey
Sportspeople from Monmouth County, New Jersey
USA Outdoor Track and Field Championships winners
USA Indoor Track and Field Championships winners
20th-century American people